Macanese, of or from Macau, may refer to:

 Macanese people, a mixed ethnic group from Macau
 Macau people, people of Macau generally
 Macanese Patois, a Portuguese-based creole language
 Macanese cuisine, the cuisine of Macau
 Culture of Macau or Macanese culture

Language and nationality disambiguation pages